Karl Peter Gillmann (1900–1963) was a German actor, screenwriter and film director. He co-wrote the 1938 comedy Napoleon Is to Blame for Everything with Curt Goetz.

Selected filmography

Screenwriter
 One Hour of Happiness (1931)
 The Private Life of Louis XIV (1935)
 Pillars of Society (1935)
 The Postman from Longjumeau (1936)
 Darling of the Sailors (1937)
 Napoleon Is to Blame for Everything (1938)
 Bachelor's Paradise (1939)
 Trouble Backstairs (1949)
 Scandal at the Embassy (1950)
 A Heidelberg Romance (1951)
 Diary of a Married Woman (1953)
 Agatha, Stop That Murdering! (1960)

Director
 Doctor Praetorius (1950)

References

Bibliography 
 Langford, Michelle. Directory of World Cinema: Germany. Intellect Books, 2012.

External links 
 

1900 births
1963 deaths
Film people from North Rhine-Westphalia
People from Landau